This is a list of flags inscribed with Russian-language text.

See also
List of inscribed flags

Notes

Russian language
Flags